Daniel Newman may refer to:

 Daniel Newman (American actor) (born 1981), American actor, model and musician
 Daniel Newman (British actor) (born 1976), British actor
 Daniel Newman (academic) (born 1963), British writer, scholar and translator of Arabic literature
 Daniel Newman (politician), New Zealand politician on Auckland Council
 Daniel F. Newman (1935–2009), American politician in New Jersey